The Javan leafbird (Chloropsis cochinchinensis) is a species of leafbird found in forest and second growth in Java. The Javan leafbird was formerly grouped with the blue-winged leafbird (Chloropsis moluccensis), but more recent phylogenetic studies have split both. The distribution of the blue-winged and the Bornean leafbird are known to approach each other, but there is no evidence of intergradation.

The species is endangered largely due to overexploitation for the Asian songbird trade. Although leafbirds were a moderately popular choice of cage birds for many years, the popularity of leafbirds skyrocketed in recent years after the greater green leafbird (C. sonnerati) became exceptionally sought-after. As the Javan leafbird is a primarily lowland-dwelling species, it is at high risk of severe overexploitation as its entire range is accessible to trappers. There have been reports of loss of C. cochinchinensis from previously-occupied sites while the habitat remains unchanged, indicating the risks that trapping poses to the species.

References

Javan leafbird
Javan leafbird
Javan leafbird
Birds of Java